Eddie Lee Anderson Jr. (born July 22, 1963) is a former American football safety in the National Football League. He was drafted by the Seattle Seahawks in the sixth round of the 1986 NFL Draft. He played college football at Fort Valley State.

Anderson also played for the Oakland Raiders. With the Raiders, Anderson set the team record for longest interception return against the Miami Dolphins in 1992, scoring on a 102-yard return.

References

1963 births
Living people
American football safeties
Fort Valley State Wildcats football players
Seattle Seahawks players
Los Angeles Raiders players
Oakland Raiders players
Players of American football from Georgia (U.S. state)
People from Warner Robins, Georgia
National Football League replacement players